Little Eggs: An African Rescue (released in Mexico, Latin America and the United States as Un rescate de huevitos; formerly Huevitos en fuga) is a 2021 Mexican animated comedy film produced by Huevocartoon Producciones.

The Spanish voice cast returned to reprise their respective roles, joined by new cast members including Jesús Ochoa, Mauricio Barrientos, Mara Escalante, and comedian duo Freddy and Germán Ortega.

The fourth film in the Huevos franchise, as well the second CG installment following Un gallo con muchos huevos, it was released in Mexico on August 12, 2021. It was followed by a limited theatrical release in the United States a few weeks later on August 27, 2021 by Pantelion Films.

Upon its release, the film received acclaim, with praise towards the animation and positive messages, with many favorable comparisons to DreamWorks Animation. It grossed $50 million pesos (US$2.43 million) in its theatrical run in Mexico.

Plot

On a peaceful morning at the "Granjas el Pollon", Toto is starting his morning routine when Bacon informs him that Di has given birth to their new egg children, Max and Uly. Their golden appearance leads La Abuelita to submit them for a ranch contest, catching the attention of Duquesa, a Russian egg collector. At first, Toto is excited until the children express desire to play in the outdoors, causing Toto to worry and immediately become over protective. He eventually allows them to play under Bibi's supervision, but uses many protective procedures along the way. Just then, two opossums Tlacua and Cuache, disguised as chickens, sneak into the farm in an attempt to eat chickens when Perro Fidencio locks them up in an empty farmhouse. This causes more concern for Toto, but after Di's advice, he promises his children playtime after the contest.

The following day, Max and Uly are declared winners at the egg contest for their golden appearance, as Duquesa offers Abuelita $200 dollars but refuses and pays her back instead. Outraged, she orders the two bandit brothers, Panzovich and Gordimitri to track the "Granjas el Pollon" farm. Meanwhile, on the way home, Toto once again becomes worried for his children after Duquesa's encounter and tears up their winning ribbons, making them afraid of him. Later that night, the remorseful Toto sits by the pond when the Russian collectors send hunting moles in mind-controlled helmets to track and kidnap Max and Uly. Bibi and Willy track down one of the moles, named Toporocho, who thanks them for freeing him from the helmet. In return, he helps Toto and his friends board the cargo plane to Africa. They track the plane down and board inside.

Inside the plane, the egg children meet a variety of fellow-snatched eggs inside named jars, including those of a peacock, an eagle, a parrot, a roadrunner, a quail, and returning characters including Coco, Iguano, Serp, Torti, Lagartijo, Manotas, and Huevo de Halcón. Toto and company then make it into the cargo room when a fight between the bandit brothers breaks out. Toto and Di were eventually thrown off the plane, and Willy, Bibi, Bacon, and Toporocho saved them with a parachute, ending up in Congo. As Duquesa and the bandit brothers drive off, Toto and his company were underground, splashed to a hippo's river where three hippos give them a ride.

Upon arrival at Barón's mansion, Duquesa presented Max and Uly to the Master Chef, which he ordered all the eggs be refrigerated for two days. After introducing themselves to one another, the eggs get into an argument when Max and Uly, thanks to Di's loosening of their jar, freed them all. They then find a way to control the temperature, at which Manotas only lowered it further. This led to Serp being used to open the lock with his rattle.

Meanwhile, as Toto's group were riding on the three hippos, he and Di have a conversation about their kids when two monkeys take them to a jungle talent show audition where the monkeys find Toto funny. Back at Barón's mansion, the escaping eggs finally unlocked the cage and the roadrunner egg raised the temperature up again. Afterwards, the eggs make up a plan to hide as plant rocks.

At the talent show, many performing animals were judged and rejected by four animals judges led by King "Leonidas I". Toto, dressed as a clown, and Di were locked up in cages before the next performance. Toto was downed when Di encouraged him to perform and stand up to Leonidas. He did so and got into a battle with the King lion, and defeated him - with the help of his egg friends. Just as they're about to leave, Di encouraged the entire animal audience to join for a battle against the humans.

Barón Roncovich later arrived at his mansion, and the Master Chef's crew take the plants to the dining hall where Duquesa hosted a dinner auction. The Chef's crew later discover the eggs' disappearance; however, he found them on the plants they were hiding and ordered the crew to gather them. Just then, Toto and his crew, along with animals he recruited, battle against the guests and the bandits. After claiming victory and rescuing the eggs, Toto and Di were finally reunited with Max and Uly, where Toto apologized to his children for the ribbon incident. Suddenly, a huge gas leak-triggered fire broke out and Toto and Di managed to escape alive with their children eggs.

They board on a plane back home after bidding goodbye to their animal friends. However, the now-fired Duquesa found her way inside and locked all the doors, in attempt to steal back the eggs for her own plans. An idea came to Max and Uly and they tried to enter the cargo room when Toto briefly held them back before agreeing to trust them. As they fought back against Duquesa, Huevo de Águila Real hatched into a newborn eagle and sent her flying out of the plane with a parachute. Following another victory, the entire crew sang and danced. Meanwhile, Duquesa complained about studying as she landed at a river. Toto's family and friends finally made it back with Max and Uly to the "Granjas", continuing the dance party as the roadrunner egg ends the film.

In the mid-credits scene, Tlacua and Cuache were paddling from inside their cage when they fall down a waterfall.

Voice cast

Spanish cast
Bruno Bichir as Toto, a rooster and Di's husband and Willy's best friend. He becomes overprotective over the safety of his new children, Max and Uly, but learns how to be a real father through advice, experience, and adventure.
Maite Perroni as Di, a beautiful hen, Toto's supportive wife, and Bibi's best friend. She helps Toto with advice in caring for their newborn egg children. She goes along with Toto and their egg friends to save their children.
Carlos Espejel as Willy, a chicken egg and ex-sergeant who is Toto's best friend and Bibi's boyfriend.
Angélica Vale as Bibi, a beautiful chicken egg and Willy's girlfriend and one of Toto's friends.
Mayra Rojas as Duquesa, a leader of the Russian egg collector for Africa's wealthy food event.
Oliver Flores as Max, a newborn golden egg who is Uly's twin brother and Toto and Di's son.
Dione Riva Palacio Santacruz as Uly, a newborn golden egg who is Max's twin sister and Toto and Di's daughter.
Ariel Miramontes as Master Chef
Héctor Lee as Panzovich
Juan Frese as Gordimitri
Jesús Ochoa as Rey León "Leonidas I"
Freddy Ortega as El Chango Bananero
Humberto Vélez as Barón Roncovich
Germán Ortega as El Chango Petacón
Claudio Herrera as:
Toporocho, a mole who helped Toto and his friends get to Duquesa and find their children after being freed by Willy and Bibi from a mind-controlling helmet.
Herrera also voiced El Presentador.
Gabriel Riva Palacio as:
Confi, a Cascarón goofball egg.
Torti, a slow-speaking turtle egg with powerful jaws.
Serp, a short-tempered rattle snake egg.
Rodolfo Riva Palacio as:
Coco, a crocodile egg.
Cuache, an easy-going opossum.
Don Fidencio, the ranch's blind dog.
Iguano, an iguana egg and Coco's second-in-command.
Mauricio Barrientos as El Huevo de Águila Real, a sophisticated but hearty eagle egg who is among the eggs captured. He later hatches and becomes a newborn eagle.
Mónica Santacruz as Pavi, a pretty peacock egg.
Ximena de Anda as Huevo de Codorniz, a famine quail egg.
Pepe Lavat as Don Poncho, Di's father, Toto's father-in-law, and Max and Uly's grandfather. Lavat, along with Morán, were later dedicated in memory at the end credits.
Lulú Morán as Mama Gallina, Toto's mother hen. Morán, along with Lavat, were dedicated in memory at the end credits.
María Alicia Delgado as La Abuelita, an elderly woman who is the owner of the "Granjas el Pollon" farm.

Production

The film utilized full computer-generated imagery animation for the second time, following Un gallo con muchos huevos with about an expected overall increase of fifteen percent of image quality up to the fifth installment, which is currently in development. Like Un gallo, while being produced in Mexico, the film is intended for an international outreach. "We wanted to make this film very international, without losing the Mexican identity. It has jokes and positive messages," said co-producer Ignacio Casares. The film has been in development during the COVID-19 pandemic in which many crew members, around 80 people, are working remotely from their homes. A total of 350 people from all departments have worked on the film, with an average worktime taking one month per minute.

The film's overprotective theme for Toto's father character came from co-director Rodolfo Riva Palacio Alatriste's own parenting experience with his daughter, Dione, who voiced Uli in the film. Rodolfo also explained that the theme of collecting eggs and endangered animal species for expensive food served as the basis for the screenplay, after he and his brother Gabriel read articles on the topic.

Casting
Before the animation process, much of the actors had recorded their lines for adaptation.

Music
Zacarías M. de la Riva, a Spanish composer who previously worked on Un gallo con muchos huevos, has returned to compose this film with a 75-piece orchestra performance in Bratislava. It was originally planned to be scored in Bulgaria.

As with Un gallo, Zacarías has faced challenges in composing music in animated films, as it required the balancing of adventure, drama and comedy. Despite this, he called it "a great joy" and "truly [marvelous] to [be working] again with directors Gabriel and Rodolfo Riva-Palacio." The composer added that the film reused some music pieces from his work in Un gallo.

Soundtrack
The film's score soundtrack album was released digitally by MovieScore Media on August 13, 2021.

Release
The film was originally planned for a 2019 release in Mexico, and then August 2020, but has been postponed due to the ongoing COVID-19 pandemic. The film's first poster was released in March 2020, followed by teaser trailer was released on 10 April later that year.

It was officially released in theaters in Mexico on 12 August 2021. Co-director and co-writer Rodolfo Riva Palacio Alatriste told an interviewer at M2 that being able to make four films is a "surprise", reflecting on the release of the franchise's first film released in 2006.

The film was later released in the United States in limited release on 27 August 2021 through Pantelion Films. The film's directors Gabriel and Rodolfo Riva have expressed that they will "compete against the United States" and are "capable".

The film was dedicated in memory of Mexican voice actors Pepe Lavat and Lulu Morán, who died in 2018 and 2019 respectively.

Internationally, the film was released as Little Eggs: An African Rescue.

Critical reception
The film opened mixed to favorable reviews from critics, with many praising its improving animation, humor, faithfulness to the franchise and its design, and its "important" messages. On Tomatazos, it has a 100% rating of positive critic reviews. It currently has no score on the mainline Rotten Tomatoes.

Monique Jones of Common Sense Media rated the film 3 out of 5 stars, praising the film's story and themes behind it, calling it "well made", while divided over its humor.

Box office
Upon its release in Mexico, the film debuted in #3 at the box-office, grossing around MX$15 million (US$0.75 million) with an audience count of 239,400. In its second weekend, it dropped to the #4 position, earning an additional MX$8.6 million (US$0.4 million) and 147,600 audience count. Its ticket sales have made the Huevos franchise Mexico's highest-viewed film series in the national industry, surpassing the numbers of the No Manches Frida films with 11.75 million at the time. The film remained successful at its third weekend, grossing MX$5.6 million (US$0.28 million) at its #5 position and 100,200 viewers. In September, the film earned MX$3.4 million with 60,600 audiences, remaining at #4. On its fifth weekend, the film grossed MX$2.5 million pesos (US$0.12 million) with an audience count of 43,900. On its sixth, it has grossed MX$1.1 million pesos (US$0.05 million) at the #10 place, with an audience count of 41,200. To date, it has grossed MX$50 million pesos ($2.43 million) and had an audience count of over 900,000.

In the United States, the film has grossed $430,000 on its opening weekend with an average gross of $1,300 per screening in 320 locations at the time.

Accolades

Awards and nominations

Sequel

A fifth installment, titled Huevitos congelados, was released on December 14, 2022 on Vix+.

See also
Una película de huevos
Otra película de huevos y un pollo
Un gallo con muchos huevos
Marcianos vs. Mexicanos

References

External links
Official website

IMCINE profile
Videocine page

2021 films
2021 comedy films
2021 fantasy films
2021 adventure films
2021 computer-animated films
2020s Mexican films
2020s children's adventure films
2020s children's comedy films
2020s children's fantasy films
2020s children's animated films
2020s adventure comedy films
2020s fantasy comedy films
2020s Spanish-language films
Mexican animated films
Mexican children's films
Mexican adventure comedy films
Mexican fantasy comedy films
Mexican sequel films
Animated adventure films
Animated comedy films
Animated fantasy films
Animated films about chickens
Films about food and drink
Films set in Mexico
Films set on farms
Films set in Africa
Films set in 2021
Films postponed due to the COVID-19 pandemic
Films impacted by the COVID-19 pandemic
Films scored by Zacarías M. de la Riva
Eggs in culture